The arrondissement of Paris is an arrondissement of France in the Île-de-France region. It covers exactly the commune and department of Paris.

It has one subdivision: the commune of Paris, which itself has 20 subdivisions: the 20 municipal arrondissements of Paris.

History
In 1800 the arrondissement of Paris was established as part of the department Seine. In 1962 it absorbed the communes of the former arrondissements of Saint-Denis and Sceaux. In 1964 and 1966 it lost territory to the new arrondissements of Bobigny, Créteil, Nanterre, Antony and Nogent-sur-Marne. In 1968 the department Seine  was disbanded, and the arrondissement of Paris became the single arrondissement of the department of Paris.

References

Paris